The 1953 Marshall Thundering Herd football team was an American football team that represented Marshall University as an independent during the 1953 college football season. In its first season under head coach Herb Royer, the team compiled a 2–5–2 record and was outscored by a total of 180 to 109. John Chmara and Phil Milano were the team captains. The team played its home games at Fairfield Stadium in Huntington, West Virginia.

Schedule

References

Marshall
Marshall Thundering Herd football seasons
Marshall Thundering Herd football